Ernstia laxa is a species of calcareous sponge in the family Clathrinidae found in New Zealand. The species name is derived from Latin meaning "wide".

Description
This species is similar to Ascaltis reticulum except it has wider and thicker actines. More research is needed to confirm the correct classification of this organism.

References
World Register of Marine Species entry

Clathrina
Sponges described in 1896
Sponges of New Zealand